Heinrich Hubert Houben (30 March 1875 – 27 July 1935) was a German literary historian. From 1907 to 1919 Houben was literary director of the publishing firm Brockhaus.

Works
 Zeitschriften der Romantik [Romantic magazines], 1904
 (ed.) Gespräche mit Goethe in den letzten Jahren seines Lebens [Conversations with Goethe in the last years of his life], 1909
 Jungdeutscher Sturm und Drang: Ergebnisse und Studien, 1911
 Verbotene Literatur von der klassischen Zeit bis zur Gegenwart; ein kritisch-historisches Lexikon über verbotene Bücher, Zeitschriften und Theaterstücke, Schriftsteller und Verleger [Banned literature from the classical period to the present], 1925
 Gespräche mit Heine [Conversations with Heine], 1926
 (ed.) Zehn Jahre bei Goethe : Erinnerungen an Weimars klassische Zeit 1822-1832 [Ten years with Goethe: memories of Weimar's classical period, 1822-1832] by Frédéric Soret. 1929.
 Der polizeiwidrige Goethe [The police against Goethe], 1932.
 Christoper Columbus: the tragedy of a discoverer, 1935. Translated by John Linton.

References

Further reading
  Holzhausen, Hans-Dieter, 'Finderglück ist Sucherlohn: zum Gedenken an Heinrich Hubert Houben (1875-1935)', Philobiblon, 39 (1995), p. 228-241

1875 births
1935 deaths
German literary historians
German male non-fiction writers